The Beaver Lake Dam, in Admiralty Island National Monument near Angoon, Alaska, is a Civilian Conservation Corps-built structure that was built in 1936. It was listed on the National Register of Historic Places in 1995.

It was designed as part of the Admiralty Island Civilian Conservation Corps Canoe Route to raise the level of Beaver Lake by about  so that a channel between Beaver Lake and Lake Alexander could be traversed by canoes.  As of 1992, the dam had deteriorated but still kept the level of the lake higher by a foot or more.

See also
National Register of Historic Places listings in Hoonah–Angoon Census Area, Alaska

References

1936 establishments in Alaska
Civilian Conservation Corps in Alaska
Dams in Alaska
Buildings and structures on the National Register of Historic Places in Hoonah–Angoon Census Area, Alaska
Tongass National Forest
Dams on the National Register of Historic Places in Alaska

Dams completed in 1936